Springs is a census-designated place (CDP) roughly corresponding to the hamlet by the same name in the Town of East Hampton in Suffolk County, New York, United States, on the South Fork of Long Island. As of the 2010 United States Census, the CDP population was 6,592.

Geography

Demographics

History

Springs is known in art circles as the cradle of the abstract expressionist movement. Artists such as Jackson Pollock, Willem de Kooning and John Ferren worked there. Writers such as Kurt Vonnegut, Joseph Heller, Philip Roth, Nora Ephron, and John Steinbeck have lived in or near Springs. Artists and writers were attracted to the area due to its rural nature, despite being within  of New York City, and because housing prices "north of the Montauk Highway" on the bay side of the East Hampton peninsula have traditionally been lower than those closer to the Atlantic Ocean. Traditionally, locals are referred to as "Bonackers" which comes from Accabonac Harbor in Springs. East Hampton High School has adopted the Bonacker name for its sports teams.

The main roads connecting Springs to East Hampton are Springs-Fireplace Road and Three Mile Harbor Road. Jackson Pollock died in a car crash on Springs-Fireplace Road in 1956. Pollock and his wife Lee Krasner are buried in Green River Cemetery. Pollock's grave is marked by a large glacial erratic stone on top of a hill, Krasner's by a small stone lower on the hill. Since Pollock's burial, numerous other writers and artists have been buried in the cemetery, joining the locals.

The Pollock-Krasner House and Studio on Springs-Fireplace Road is owned by Stony Brook University and is open for tours by appointment. It includes an external studio shed where dried paint from Pollock's projects is splattered on the floor and evokes Pollock's most famous works. The neighborhood around it is an East Hampton historic district. Springs-Fireplace Road gets its name from fireplaces at its terminus that was used to signal the residents of Gardiners Island that supplies were ready to be picked up.

Education
The Springs Union Free School District operates the Springs School, which educates students from pre-kindergarten through grade 8. High school students attend East Hampton High School.

Gallery

Landmarks
 Ashawagh Hall
 Barnes's Country Store
 Charles Parsons Blacksmith Building
 Green River Cemetery
 Merrill Lake Sanctuary, owned by The Nature Conservancy
 Pollock-Krasner House and Studio
 Pussy's Pond Park
 Springs General Store
 Springs Historical Society (Springs Library)
 Springs School

Beaches
 Accabonac Beach
 Barnes Hole Beach
 Clearwater Beach (private)
 Louse Point Beach
 Maidstone Park Beach
 Sammys Beach

Notable people 
 Joseph Heller  (1923-1999) was an author of novels, short stories, plays, and screenplays.
 Lee Krasner (1908-1984) was an abstract expressionist painter and spouse of Jackson Pollock.
 Marijane Meaker (1927-2022) was an author of novels, children's stories, biographies, and is considered one of the founders of the lesbian pulp fiction genre.
 Jackson Pollock (1912-1956) was a painter and a major figure in the abstract expressionist movement.

Demographics of the CDP
As of the census of 2010, there were 6,592 people, 2,318 households, and 1,500 families residing in the CDP. The population density was 775.5 per square mile (301.0/km2). There were 4,340 housing units at an average density of 510.6/sq mi (198.2/km2). The racial makeup of the CDP was 83.3% White, 1.7% African American, 0.7% Native American, 1.5% Asian, 0.02% Pacific Islander, 11.3% some other race, and 1.5% from two or more races. Hispanic or Latino of any race were 36.6% of the population.

There were 2,318 households, out of which 34.4% had children under the age of 18 living with them, 49.4% were headed by married couples living together, 9.6% had a female householder with no husband present, and 35.3% were non-families. 25.7% of all households were made up of individuals, and 10.6% were someone living alone who was 65 years of age or older. The average household size was 2.84, and the average family size was 3.27.

In the CDP, the population was spread out, with 21.8% under the age of 18, 8.0% from 18 to 24, 29.8% from 25 to 44, 28.1% from 45 to 64, and 12.3% who were 65 years of age or older. The median age was 38.5 years. For every 100 females, there were 108.5 males. For every 100 females age 18 and over, there were 110.7 males.

For the period 2007–2011, the median annual income for a household in the CDP was $70,546, and the median income for a family was $85,582. Males had a median income of $37,000 versus $35,607 for females. The per capita income for the CDP was $33,937. About 4.7% of families and 10.3% of the population were below the poverty line, including 14.7% of those under age 18 and 3.5% of those age 65 or over.

References

External links
Pollock-Krasner House

East Hampton (town), New York
Hamlets in New York (state)
Census-designated places in New York (state)
Census-designated places in Suffolk County, New York
Hamlets in Suffolk County, New York
Populated coastal places in New York (state)